Cosmeombra is a genus of moths belonging to the family Tineidae. It contains only one species, Cosmeombra doxochares, which is found in South Africa.

References

Endemic moths of South Africa
Tineidae
Monotypic moth genera
Moths of Africa
Tineidae genera